Leuconitocris microphthalma is a species of beetle in the family Cerambycidae. It was described by Stephan von Breuning in 1950, originally under the genus Nitocris. It is known from Sierra Leone and the Democratic Republic of the Congo.

Subspecies
 Leuconitocris microphthalma microphthalma (Breuning, 1950)
 Leuconitocris microphthalma rossii (Téocchi, 1992)

References

Leuconitocris
Beetles described in 1950